Enterprise Plantation is located about  west of Jeanerette, Louisiana, off US 90.  It was built in 1835 and its  area, comprising the plantation house and several other historic buildings, was added to the National Register of Historic Places on March 17, 1975.

Simeon Patout, an immigrant from a family of vintners from Usay, France, built the house with plans to grow grapes. The conditions were unfavorable for that, so he began sugar production instead. Although he died from yellow fever in 1847, his family has continued to own and operate the sugar farm. The sugar facility is now known as M.A. Patout & Son, Ltd. Member of the family occupy Enterprise Plantation.

See also
National Register of Historic Places listings in Iberia Parish, Louisiana

References

Jeanerette, Louisiana
Houses on the National Register of Historic Places in Louisiana
Houses completed in 1835
Houses in Iberia Parish, Louisiana
National Register of Historic Places in Iberia Parish, Louisiana